James Paynter (1666 - ?) was the leader of a Jacobite uprising in Cornwall in the 18th century.

In 1715 he took an active part in proclaiming James Francis Edward Stuart (the Old Pretender) on the death of Queen Anne, for this he was tried for High Treason  at Launceston but claiming his right as a Cornish tinner he was tried in front of a jury of other Cornish tinners and was acquitted. He then was and welcomed by "bonfire and by ball" from thence to the Land's End. For his actions he was created Marquess of Trelissick (also called Marquis of Trelessick) in the Jacobite Peerage on 20 June 1715.

Family
James Paynter was descended from the wealthy Paynter family of Trelissick Manor in Hayle; he was from a junior branch of this family that settled at Trekenning House in St Columb Major parish. His Paynter relatives at Boskenna were also known to be Jacobite sympathisers and in 1745 villagers at St Buryan were convinced that the Paynter family were harbouring Charles Edward Stuart (the Young Pretender).

Other Jacobite leaders in the Southwest
Sir Richard Vyvyan: in 1715 he was imprisoned in the Tower of London. His wife Mary joined him there and, while in the Tower, gave birth to a daughter.
James Butler, 2nd Duke of Ormonde: in August 1715 he was attainted, his estate forfeited, and honours extinguished.
George Granville, 1st Baron Lansdowne, was imprisoned in the Tower of London between 1715 and 1717.
 John Anstis: on 30 September 1715 he was arrested on suspicion of involvement in plotting. A protracted legal battle ensued as Anstis claimed the title of Garter. Anstis eventually emerged victorious in May 1718

References

Further reading

West Britons  by Mark Stoyle
An Incident in Cornwall in 1715, JRIC XX (1921) by Henry Jenner
"When Fortune Frowns" a novel by Kitty Lee Jenner (1895)
 Jacobite days in the West an article published by Devonshire Association for the Advancement of Science, Literature and Art, (259-260) P.Q. Karkeek, (1896)
A Faithful Register of the late Rebellion. London, 1718. (Trials of Prisoners.)
 The Jacobite Activities in South and West England in the Summer of 1715 by Charles Petrie (1935).
 English Jacobitism, 1710-1715; Myth and Reality by G. V. Bennett

External links
 John Parker, witness of the proclamation

Cornish Jacobites
People from St Buryan
Peers created by James Francis Edward Stuart
Trelissick